Sar Tuf or Sartuf may refer to:
 Sar Tuf, Khuzestan (سرتوف - Sar Tūf)
 Sartuf Kat, Kohgiluyeh and Boyer-Ahmad Province
 Sartuf-e Delik, Kohgiluyeh and Boyer-Ahmad Province